Lepechiniella is a genus of flowering plants belonging to the family Boraginaceae.

Its native range is Iran and Western Himalaya, to Xinjiang (in China). It is also found in the countries of Afghanistan, Kazakhstan, Kyrgyzstan, Pakistan, Tajikistan, Turkmenistan and Uzbekistan.

The genus name of Lepechiniella is in honour of Ivan Lepyokhin (1740–1802), a Russian naturalist, zoologist, botanist and explorer.
It was first described and published in V.L.Komarov (ed.), Fl. URSS Vol.19 on page 713 in 1953.

Known species
According to Kew:
Lepechiniella alatavica 
Lepechiniella austrodshungarica 
Lepechiniella fursei 
Lepechiniella korshinskyi 
Lepechiniella lasiocarpa 
Lepechiniella michaelis 
Lepechiniella microcarpa 
Lepechiniella minuta 
Lepechiniella omphaloides 
Lepechiniella persica 
Lepechiniella sarawschanica 
Lepechiniella saurica 
Lepechiniella ulacholica

References

Boraginoideae
Boraginaceae genera
Plants described in 1953
Flora of Iran
Flora of Central Asia
Flora of Afghanistan
Flora of Pakistan
Flora of West Himalaya